Koolma is a village in Lüganuse Parish, Ida-Viru County in northeastern Estonia.

References
 

Villages in Ida-Viru County
Lüganuse Parish